Yvette Freeman is an American actress, singer and director. Predominantly active as a stage actress, she made her Broadway debut in 1979 in the original production of Ain't Misbehavin'. She won the Obie Award for Distinguished Performance by an Actress for her portrayal of Dinah Washington in the 1998 Off-Broadway play Dinah Was. On television, she is best known for her roles as Haleh Adams in the NBC medical drama series ER, Evelyn Smalley in the TV series Working , and Irma Lerman in Orange Is the New Black.

Life and career
Freeman was born and raised in Wilmington, Delaware. She later moved to New York City to pursue a career in graphic design. There she turned to acting on stage productions, before appearing in The Wiz and Ain't Misbehavin'. At the same time, she also worked as a singer in nightclubs and performed in cabaret. In 1990, Freeman relocated to Los Angeles, and began appearing on television, in shows like Tales from the Crypt, Knots Landing, and L.A. Law.

Freeman is best known for her role as Haleh Adams, a registered nurse, on the NBC medical drama series ER. She played the role from 1994 to the series finale in 2009, appearing in 184 episodes total. She was one of the longest-serving recurring characters on the show, having appeared in every season since 1994, with her first appearance in the two-hour pilot episode. From 1997 to 1999, she was also a regular on the NBC sitcom Working, while still appearing in ER. In 2002, during ER summer hiatus, she lost 120 pounds and now speaks as a positive advocate for weight loss.

In 1999, Freeman released her debut album, A Tribute to Dinah Washington, after performing in the Off-Broadway production of Dinah Was She won the Obie Award for Distinguished Performance by an Actress in 1998. In 2012, she played Ma Rainey, the Mother of the Blues in the Huntington Theatre Company production of August Wilson's Ma Rainey's Black Bottom.

In 2000s, Freeman had recurring roles on the daytime soap operas Days of Our Lives and The Bold and the Beautiful, and guest starred on Judging Amy, Boston Public, and CSI: Crime Scene Investigation. In 2014, Freeman was cast as Irma, one of  "The Golden Girls", in the Netflix comedy-drama series, Orange Is the New Black. Along with cast, Freeman received Screen Actors Guild Award for Outstanding Performance by an Ensemble in a Comedy Series.

Filmography

Film/Movie

Television

References

External links 
 
 

Actresses from Wilmington, Delaware
American film actresses
American television actresses
Living people
20th-century American actresses
21st-century American actresses
African-American actresses
American stage actresses
20th-century African-American women
20th-century African-American people
21st-century African-American women
21st-century African-American people
Year of birth missing (living people)